Lectionary 268, designated by siglum ℓ 268 (in the Gregory-Aland numbering) is a Greek manuscript of the New Testament, on parchment. Palaeographically it has been assigned to the 12th century.
Scrivener labelled it as 174e,
Gregory by 268e. The manuscript has complex contents. Formerly it was known as Nanianus 169.

Description 

The codex contains lessons from the Gospel of John, Matthew, and Luke (Evangelistarium).
It contains some lessons from the Old Testament. Some apocryphal material about Joseph the spouse Maria's was added by a later hand.

The text is written in Greek large minuscule letters, on 281 parchment leaves, in two columns per page, 20 lines per page.

The manuscript contains weekday Gospel lessons from Easter to Pentecost and Saturday/Sunday Gospel lessons for the other weeks.

History 

Scrivener and Gregory dated the manuscript to the 12th century. It is presently assigned by the INTF to the 12th century.

The manuscript was added to the list of New Testament manuscripts by Scrivener (number 174e) and Gregory (number 268e). Gregory saw the manuscript in 1886.

The manuscript is not cited in the critical editions of the Greek New Testament (UBS3).

Currently the codex is housed at the Biblioteca Marciana (Gr. I.48 (1199)) in Venice.

See also 

 List of New Testament lectionaries
 Biblical manuscript
 Textual criticism

Notes and references

Bibliography 

 

Greek New Testament lectionaries
12th-century biblical manuscripts